St Cuthbert Without is a civil parish in the Carlisle district of Cumbria, England.  It contains 43 listed buildings that are recorded in the National Heritage List for England.  Of these, two are listed at Grade II*, the middle of the three grades, and the others are at Grade II, the lowest grade.  The parish includes the southern suburbs of Carlisle including Garlands, and the villages of Blackwell, Brisco, Carleton, and Wreay, together with the surrounding countryside.  Most of the listed buildings are country houses, smaller houses and associated structures, farmhouses, and farm buildings.  The other listed buildings include a church and associated structures, a former mortuary chapel, a former hospital chapel, and a well head.


Key

Buildings

Notes and references

Notes

Citations

Sources

Lists of listed buildings in Cumbria